Tomomi Sugimoto (born 9 November 1994) is a Japanese archer competing in women's recurve events. At the 2018 Asian Games in Jakarta, Indonesia, she won the gold medal in the mixed team recurve event and the bronze medal in the women's team recurve event.

At the 2019 Archery World Cup she won the bronze medal in the women's recurve event in Medellín, Colombia and the silver medal in that event at the competition held in Shanghai, China.

In 2021, she competed at the 2021 World Archery Championships held in Yankton, United States.

References

External links 

 

Living people
1994 births
Place of birth missing (living people)
Japanese female archers
Asian Games medalists in archery
Asian Games gold medalists for Japan
Asian Games bronze medalists for Japan
Archers at the 2018 Asian Games
Medalists at the 2018 Asian Games
21st-century Japanese women